How Japan Plans to Win is the English translation of The Three-Power Alliance and the United States-Japanese War, a work of current events by Kinoaki Matsuo, a Japanese Foreign Affairs Officer, Navy Admiralty Liaison, Navy strategizer, and member of the Black Dragon Society. The English translation was performed by Kilsoo Haan, a Korean anti-Japanese operative living in the United States. It was published in 1942 simultaneously in Boston by Little, Brown and Company (323 pages) and in London by George G. Harrap and Company (240 pages). The book was reviewed in such publications as The New York Times and the Council on Foreign Relations journal, Foreign Affairs.

The book was originally published in Japan by the Foreign Office Press in late 1940. It has been described by some historians as the Japanese counterpart to the United States government contingency plan War Plan Orange.

Synopsis
Kinoaki predicts an impending attack on Japan by the United States that will leave no alternative to an existential war of attrition between the two powers, pitting Japan against an arrogant, racist enemy and overwhelming odds.

Controversy
A copy of the book is alleged to have been stolen from Kinoaki himself by the book’s translator, Kilsoo Haan.

Some Japanese sources allege that the book is actually a work of propaganda, intended to lift civilian morale and reassure the public of that Japan will have a chance for a negotiated peace in the event it finds itself coerced into war with the United States.

One reviewer described the book as being "on a level far beneath Mein Kampf."

Covers
The version published in Boston by Little, Brown and Company featured a reproduction of the Japanese book cover and endsheets. This entailed black cloth boards with the Japanese title in red, vertically, along the right side of the cover. The endsheets were emblazoned with a red and white naval theme.

The book published in London by George G. Harrap and Company featured tan cloth boards without a title on the front or back covers.

Reviews
 Chamberlain, William Henry (Apr. 26, 1942). "A Pep Talk for the Japanese." Review of How Japan Plans to Win, by Kinoaki Matsuo. The New York Times. p. BR18.
 Woolbert, Robert Gale (Jul. 1942). Review of How Japan Plans to Win, by Kinoaki Matsuo. Foreign Affairs, vol. 20, no. 4. p. 785.
 Ainger, E. (Sep. 1942). Review of How Japan Plans to Win, by Kinoaki Matsuo. International Affairs Review Supplement, vol. 19, no. 9. pp. 519–520.

References

External links
Full text at Internet Archive
Kilsoo Haan at Densho Encyclopedia

松尾樹明『三國同盟と日米戰』霞ヶ關書房 1940.10 増補改訂版 (English: The Three-Power Alliance and a United States-Japanese War). Foreign Office Press, 1940.

1940 non-fiction books
Japanese non-fiction books
Little, Brown and Company books
Current affairs books
Books about Japan
Japan–United States military relations
Translations into English